Gonella is a surname. Notable people with the surname include:

Guido Gonella (1905–1982), Italian politician
Nat Gonella (1908–1998), British jazz trumpeter, bandleader, vocalist and mellophonist
Pier Gonella, Italian guitarist 
Sergio Gonella (1933–2018), Italian businessman and football referee